WWE’s Most Wanted Treasures is an American reality television series. The series premiered on A&E on April 18, 2021.

On March 1, 2022, it was announced that A&E had ordered 24 more episodes of the series.

Plot
The series involves WWE personalities, instructed by Triple H and Stephanie McMahon, traveling across the country with A. J. Francis, searching for collectibles related to professional wrestling.

Series overview

Episode list

Season 1 (2021)

Season 2 (2023)

References

External links
 

2020s American reality television series
2021 American television series debuts
English-language television shows
A&E (TV network) original programming
Television series by WWE